Historically, there were various flags of Saint Christopher-Nevis-Anguilla. The "triple palm" flag, the last version, was introduced in 1967.

The "triple" in the name "triple palm" consists of three vertical stripes of green (representing Saint Kitts), yellow (representing Nevis) and blue (representing Anguilla) while the "palm" consists of a coconut palm tree symbolising the destiny, humility, and pride of the three islands.

References

See also
Flag of Anguilla
Flag of Saint Kitts and Nevis

Flag of Saint Christopher-Nevis-Anguilla
Flags of Saint Kitts and Nevis
Obsolete national flags
Blue Ensigns
Flag
Flags introduced in 1967
1967 establishments in North America
Flags displaying animals